The following is the final results of the Iranian Volleyball Super League (Velayat Cup) 2001/02 season.

Standings

References 
 volleyball.ir 
 Parssport

League 2001-02
Iran Super League, 2001-02
Iran Super League, 2001-02
Volleyball League, 2001-02
Volleyball League, 2001-02